Acrocoelus is a genus of alveolates.

History

This genus was named in 1999 by Fernández et al.

Description

The species in this genus are fusiform with an apical anterior concavity and a longitudinal groove. There are two anterior flagellae directed backward. The flagellae arise from parallel basal bodies in a flagellar pocket.

The single nucleus has a single nucleolus.

The cell wall is a trilaminate pellicle with subpellicular microtubules and a micropore.

The cytoplasm contains a single, branched mitochondrion with tubular cristae, a supranuclear Golgi apparatus and large amounts of glycan granules.

There are three types of secretory organelles present. Type I are round and structurally complex. These may be  extrusomes. The types II and III appear to be rhoptry and microneme like organelles respectively.

Taxonomy

The type species is Acrocoelus glossobalani Fernández et al 1999

References

External links

Apicomplexa genera